Kevin F. Cleary is an American sound engineer. He was nominated for three Academy Awards in the category Best Sound.

Selected filmography
 Die Hard (1988)
 The Abyss (1989)
 The Hunt for Red October (1990)

References

External links

Year of birth missing (living people)
Possibly living people
American audio engineers